Craig H. Barratt (born 12 May 1962) is an Australian technology executive who served as Chief Executive Officer at Barefoot Networks until its acquisition by Intel in July 2019. Following the acquisition, and until his departure in May 2020, he served as senior vice president and general manager of the Connectivity Group under Intel's Data Platforms Group.

Barratt previously served as the CEO of Atheros from 2003, through its IPO in 2004 until its acquisition by Qualcomm in 2011.  He continued as President of Qualcomm Atheros upon the close of the acquisition in May 2011 until early 2013. Barratt then served as Senior Vice President, Access and Energy, at Google from 2012 until 2016.

Open source software
Barratt is the author of BackupPC, an open source backup system.  He is the author of the original version of PSfrag, a LaTeX package.  He has also contributed to Rsync and other open source projects.

Education
Barratt holds Ph.D. and Master of Science degrees from Stanford University, as well as a Bachelor of Engineering degree in electrical engineering and a Bachelor of Science degree in pure mathematics and physics from the University of Sydney in Australia.  He completed high school at Barker College in 1979.

Barratt is the co-author of a book on Linear Controller Design, which is now freely available online.

References

External links 
 

Australian business executives
1962 births
Living people
Google employees